The least pipistrelle (Pipistrellus tenuis) is a species of vesper bat.

Distribution
The bat is native to South Asia, Southeast Asia, Maritime Southeast Asia, Malesia, and southwestern Oceania.

Countries and islands it can be found in include: Laos, southeastern China and Hainan island, the Philippines, Borneo, Indonesia, East Timor, Malaysia, Vietnam, Bangladesh, Sri Lanka, India, Nepal, Pakistan, and Afghanistan.

Description
The bat weighs . Females are larger than males. They are dark brown to black above, and lighter below. The wing membrane, face, and ears are black. with no pale margins like those of Indian pipistrelle. The muzzle is short and broad and the nostrils are small, rounded, and placed between facial swellings. The small ears have prominent tragi and antitragi. The fur is dense, short, silky, and covers the entire body.

Subspecies 
Subspecies include:
 Pipistrellus tenuis tenuis
 Pipistrellus tenuis mimus
 Pipistrellus tenuis murrayi
 Pipistrellus tenuis nitidus
 Pipistrellus tenuis ponceleti
 Pipistrellus tenuis portensis
 Pipistrellus tenuis sewelanus
 Pipistrellus tenuis subulidens

References

Further reading 
 John O. Whitaker J. O. Jr., Suthakar Issac S., Marimuthu G. & Kunz (1999). "Seasonal Variation in the Diet of the Indian Pygmy Bat, Pipistrellus mimus, in Southern India". Journal of Mammalogy 80(1): 60-70. JSTOR

Pipistrellus
Taxa named by Coenraad Jacob Temminck
Mammals described in 1840
Bats of Asia
Bats of Oceania
Bats of South Asia
Bats of Southeast Asia
Bats of India
Bats of Indonesia
Bats of Malaysia
Mammals of Afghanistan
Mammals of Bangladesh
Mammals of China
Mammals of Borneo
Mammals of Timor
Mammals of Nepal
Bats of New Guinea
Mammals of Pakistan
Mammals of the Philippines
Mammals of Vietnam
Least concern biota of Asia
Least concern biota of Oceania
Taxonomy articles created by Polbot